Rojith Kalliparambil Ganesh (born 13 November 1993) is an Indian cricketer who represents Kerala in domestic cricket. He is an allrounder who bats right-handed and bowls right-arm legspin.

Early life
Rojith was born on 13 November 1993 in Wadakkanchery of Thrissur district of Kerala. He started his career as a tennis-ball cricketer. He has trained in Athreya Cricket Academy in Thrissur and South Zone Kottarakara CC and then went on to play for Sree Kerala Varma College, Thrissur.

Domestic career
In December 2020, Rojith earned his maiden Kerala call-up as he was included in the Kerala squad for playing the 2020-21 Syed Mushtaq Ali Trophy based on his performances for Athreya and South Zone in state-level and national-level tournaments. Though, he did not get a chance to play in the tournament. 
 
He made his List A debut for Kerala on 22 February 2021 against Uttar Pradesh in the 2020-21 Vijay Hazare Trophy. He played only 2 matches in the tournament and had a forgettable season scoring just 10 runs and didn't take a single wicket.

He was part of the title-winning KCA Royals of the 2020-21 season of KCA President's Cup T20. His performance in the tournament led to Mumbai Indians signing him as a reserve player ahead of the 2021 Indian Premier League.

He made his Twenty20 debut on 4 November 2021, for Kerala in the 2021–22 Syed Mushtaq Ali Trophy.

References

External links
 

1993 births
Living people
Indian cricketers
Kerala cricketers
People from Thrissur